Gran Premio Lotteria, or Gran Premio della Lotteria, or in short, Lotteria,  is an annual Group One harness event that takes place at Agnano Racetrack in Naples, Italy. The competition, which was inaugurated in 1951, is regarded as one of the most prestigious international events in trotting. The winner is decided through three qualifying heats and a subsequent final later the same day. Both the eliminations and the final are raced over 1,600 meters. Gran Premio Lotteria is part of the European Grand Circuit and the overall purse for the 2009 event was €600,600, equalling approximately US$795,000. The fastest winning time in the history of the race is 1:10.5, run by Timone Ek in 2017.

Racing conditions

The races
Gran Premio Lotteria is decided through three elimination heats, followed by a final. The first three trotters of each elimination progress to the final, which is run later the same day. There is also a consolations race for the competitors that do not succeed in qualifying for the final.

Distance and starting method
The distance was, during the first seven years, 1,700 meters. This was shortened to 1,680 meters in 1959. In 1976 the distance was further decreased, to today's 1,600 meters. With the exceptions of 1951, 1952 and 1956, the race have always been started by the use of auto start.

The 2009 Lotteria

The starting list (the final)
 Algiers Hall - Roberto Vecchione (Holger Ehlert)
 Opal Viking - Björn Goop (Nils Enqvist)
 Oiseau de Feux - Jean-Michel Bazire (Fabrice Souloy)
 Island Effe - Pietro Gubellini (Edoardo Gubellini) 
 Jodas Julia - Dominiek Locqueneux (Catarina Lundström)
 Ghibellino - Roberto Andreghetti (Eric Bondo)
 Idalgo Jet - Pasquale Esposito J:r (Ottavio Silvestri)
 Classic Grand Cru - Thomas Uhrberg (Steen Juul)
 Ismos Fp - Enrico Bellei (Claus Ernst Hollman)

Swedish stallion Opal Viking, trained by Nils Enqvist and driven by Björn Goop, was betting favourite, followed by Oiseau de Feux, Algiers Hall and Ghibellino.

The race 
Algiers Hall went to the front and driver Roberto Vecchione chose to keep the lead when favourite Opal Viking announced an interest to take it over. Oiseau de Feux followed as third and the pace was very slow. In the stretch, Island Effe and Ghibellino came from behind to claim the first and second place, respectively. Oiseau de Feux overtook Opal Viking to reach third, while the Swedish favourite finished fourth.

Island Effe became the first Italian mare to win the event. The winning time for the Italian 5-year-old mare after Lemon Dra, was 1:57.1 (mile rate)/1:12.9 (km rate). The winner's purse was US$275,000.

Past winners

Horses with most wins
 3 - Birbone (1952, 1953, 1955)
 3 - Tornese (1957, 1958, 1962)
 3 - Une de Mai (1969, 1970, 1971)
 3 - Varenne (2000, 2001, 2002)
 2 - The Last Hurrah (1978, 1979)

Drivers with most wins
 5 - Vivaldo Baldi (1952, 1953, 1955, 1978, 1979)
 5 - Jean-Rene Gougeon (1967, 1969, 1970, 1971, 1976)
 4 - Stig H. Johansson (1984, 1991, 2003, 2005) 
 4 - Roberto Andreghetti (2012, 2013, 2014, 2015)
 3 - Sergio Brighenti (1958, 1962, 1963)
 3 - Giampaolo Minnucci (2000, 2001, 2002)

Trainers with most wins
 5 - Vivaldo Baldi (1952, 1953, 1955, 1978, 1979)
 4 - Sergio Brighenti (1957, 1958, 1962, 1963)
 4 - Jean-Rene Gougeon (1969, 1970, 1971, 1976)
 4 - Stig H. Johansson (1984, 1991, 2003, 2005)
 3 - Jori Turja (2000, 2001, 2002)

Sires with at least two winning offsprings
 3 - Nevele Pride (Contingent Fee, Evita Broline, Classy Rogue)
 2 - Ayres (Top Hanover, The Last Hurrah)
 2 - Pharaon (Tornese, Nievo)
 2 - Quick Pay (The Onion, Victory Tilly)
 2 - Speedy Crown (Evann C., Embassy Lobell)

Fastest winners

Auto start
 1:10.8 (km rate) - Varenne (2002)

Volt start (1951, 1952, 1956)
 1:17.8 (km rate) - Gelinotte (1956)

All winners of Gran Premio Lotteria

References

Harness races in Italy
Horse races in Italy
Sport in Naples